Sri Lanka was one of the countries struck by the tsunami resulting from the Indian Ocean earthquake on December 26, 2004. On January 3, 2005, Sri Lankan authorities reported 30,000+ confirmed deaths.

Many of the dead were adults and the elderly. The south and east coasts were worst hit. One and a half million people were displaced from their homes. The death toll continued to rise as the threat of infectious diseases breaking out turned into a reality, with doctors confirming first cases of cholera.

Tsunami and immediate effects 

In the eastern Sri Lankan Ampara District alone, more than 10,000 people died. A holiday train, the "Queen of the Sea", was struck by the tsunami near the village of Telwatta as it travelled between Colombo and Galle carrying at least 1,700 passengers, killing all but a handful on board. About 8,000 more dead were counted in the northeast region, which was controlled by the Tamil Tiger. At Trincomalee in the northeast, where the tsunami reached more than 2 km (1.25 mi) inland, over 1,000 were confirmed dead. More than 3,000 dead were reported at Batticaloa in the east. The naval base at Trincomalee was reported to be submerged.

The agricultural sector was affected seriously. 259 km² of paddy land was destroyed in the northern, eastern, southern and western coastal belts. In addition, the extensive salinization of paddy lands rendered them unsuitable for paddy cultivation. Rubbish was also deposited on paddy lands. A large number of agricultural vehicles and equipment were destroyed and canals and drains were blocked. Underground sources of water were salinated.

Across the island, collections were taken for those who had lost everything. Vans with PA systems drove around calling on people to give whatever they could – money, clothes, bottles of water and bags of rice and lentils.

Apart from homes, many hotels as well as shops were reported to have been damaged. Hotels along the south coast were full of both foreign tourists and Sri Lankans making use of the long Christmas weekend. Twenty thousand soldiers were deployed in government-controlled areas to assist in relief operations and maintain law and order after sporadic looting. Curfews had been imposed in some areas to curb looting. Chinese light T-72A anti-personnel mines, left after the two-decade civil war, were feared to have been washed up and spread by the surge of water. The Norwegian Peoples' Aid Organization assembled a team of mine sweepers to assess the situation.

In the Yala National Park, many animals seemed to move to higher regions in order to escape the disaster. It was unclear how they detected the coming disaster, although a sixth sense, perhaps the ability to hear the infrasound rumble of the tremors or approaching tsunami, was mentioned in reports.

Galle International Stadium, the test match cricket ground at Galle, was devastated.

Aftermath 

The main coastal highway in the south of Sri Lanka was closed in the aftermath of the tsunami, delaying relief supplies. An initial effort to deliver supplies was made by large numbers of private individuals filling their own vans and pickup trucks with food, clothing and bottled water and driving to affected areas.

Reports of measles and diarrhoea reached authorities, renewing fears of a deadly epidemic. Relief operations were based in Colombo.

On the morning of Thursday December 30, 2004, the Indian government warned of another possible tsunami, to make sure that the people would know what to do. However, The false alarm caused general panic in relief camps and incited traffic jams on roads leading from the coast.

The science fiction author and scuba diver Sir Arthur C Clarke, who lived in Colombo, the capital, issued a statement saying that Sri Lanka "lacks the resources and capacity to cope with the aftermath". Clarke reported that his family and staff were safe, "even though some are badly shaken and relate harrowing first hand accounts of what happened", and that his diving school (Arthur C. Clarke Diving School) "Underwater Safaris" at Hikkaduwa were destroyed.

Sri Lanka's most popular sport is cricket, and the Australian, Bangladeshi, English and South African cricket teams announced that they would donate to the humanitarian effort in Sri Lanka and other Asian countries. The Indian cricket team pledged funds to the humanitarian effort in southern India. Two one-day matches were scheduled to raise further funds.

As the tsunami left many families broken and many children living off the streets, Tamil Tigers recruited them. 141 families denounced their children where recruited.

International assistance 

An Indian Navy medical team arrived in Colombo within hours of the tsunami. Eventually India deployed 14 ships, nearly 1,000 military personnel and several dozen helicopters and airplanes to Sri Lanka.

A three-ship fleet carrying 2,000 U.S. Marines out of Diego Garcia was sent to Sri Lanka.  The Marines were bound for Iraq to assist in the January elections, but the fleet included a dozen heavy-lift helicopters and surgical hospitals, both badly needed in Sri Lanka.

On January 6, 2005, 150 members of the Canadian Disaster Assistance Response Team (DART), a Canadian Forces group, arrived in Sri Lanka. The team brought four water purification units and provided medical, engineering and communication services. Another 50 members of the team arrived on January 8 to help the people

Relief efforts were impeded by heavy monsoon rain which washed-out roads and caused freshwater flooding. In most of India the winter northeast monsoon is relatively dry, but in Sri Lanka and Tamil Nadu it blows from Burma across the Bay of Bengal picking up water from the sea.

References

External links 
Aftermath of the 2004-12-26 Tsunami in Sri Lanka
Kalutara, Sri Lanka Quickbird satellite image, DigitalGlobe Inc., 26 December 2004
How to help Sri Lanka A collaboration tool for all volunteer organizations who want to help Sri Lanka Recover from the Disaster
Shock and loss in Sri Lanka, CNN, 28 December 2004
The Power of Humanity by Thrishana Pothupitiya Daily News, Sri Lanka

Blogs 
Autism Awareness Campaign Sri Lanka blog – Tsunami in Sri Lanka News & Information
ceneus.blog – Blogging a Tragedy, Sri Lanka

Sri Lanka
2004 in Sri Lanka
History of Sri Lanka (1948–present)
Articles containing video clips